German submarine U-107 was a Type IXB U-boat of Nazi Germany's Kriegsmarine that operated during World War II. 
Between January 1941 and August 1944, she sailed on 13 active patrols at a time when a U-boat averaged a lifespan of seven to ten patrols. During that time, U-107 sank 39 Allied ships and damaged four. The U-boat was launched on 2 July 1940, based at the U-boat port of Lorient, with a crew of 53 under the initial command of Günter Hessler. She was later commanded, in order, by Harald Gelhaus, Valker Simmermacher and her final commander, Karl Heinz Fritz.

Design
German Type IXB submarines were slightly larger than the original German Type IX submarines, later designated IXA. U-107 had a displacement of  when at the surface and  while submerged. She had two shafts and two  propellers.

U-107 was fitted with six  torpedo tubes (four fitted at the bow and two at the stern), 22 torpedoes, one  SK C/32 naval gun, 180 rounds, and a  SK C/30 as well as a  C/30 anti-aircraft gun. The boat had a complement of forty-eight.

Service history

First patrol

Second patrol and most successful period

Third patrol

Fifth patrol

Sixth patrol

Eighth patrol

Ninth patrol
4 March 1943, came under attack from an unidentified Allied aircraft.
Moderately damaged by the attack.
22 March 1943 at 14:35 it came under attack from another unidentified Allied aircraft
Undamaged

Tenth patrol

Eleventh patrol

Fifteenth patrol

Sixteenth and final patrol
On 16 August 1944, U-107 departed from Lorient on a transport run to La Pallice. She was intercepted on 18 August in the Bay of Biscay, west of La Rochelle, in position , by Allied forces, and was sunk by depth charges from a Short Sunderland (serialEJ150) of No. 201 Squadron, Royal Air Force. All 58 hands were lost.

Wolfpacks
U-107 took part in 15 wolfpacks, namely:
 Störtebecker (5 – 7 November 1941) 
 Seeräuber (14 – 23 December 1941) 
 Blücher (23 – 28 August 1942) 
 Iltis (6 – 23 September 1942) 
 Hartherz (3 – 7 February 1943) 
 Delphin (11 – 14 February 1943) 
 Robbe (16 February – 13 March 1943) 
 Amsel 2 (4 – 6 May 1943) 
 Elbe (7 – 10 May 1943) 
 Elbe 2 (10 – 14 May 1943) 
 Weddigen (24 November – 7 December 1943) 
 Coronel (7 – 8 December 1943) 
 Coronel 2 (8 – 14 December 1943) 
 Coronel 3 (14 – 17 December 1943) 
 Borkum (18 – 30 December 1943)

Summary of raiding history

References

Notes

Citations

Bibliography

External links

German Type IX submarines
U-boats commissioned in 1940
U-boats sunk in 1944
World War II submarines of Germany
Shipwrecks in the Bay of Biscay
World War II shipwrecks in the Atlantic Ocean
1940 ships
Ships built in Bremen (state)
U-boats sunk by British aircraft
U-boats sunk by depth charges
Ships lost with all hands
Maritime incidents in August 1944